Looking for Trouble is a 1934 American Pre-Code crime film directed by William A. Wellman and starring Spencer Tracy, Jack Oakie and Constance Cummings. After he is rejected by a woman, a man leaves his safe job and joins a gang that robs banks.  The film features actual stock earthquake footage.

Plot
A telephone line repairman named Joe Graham (Spencer Tracy) lives in Los Angeles. One night he's offered a promotion but declines telling his boss he's happy being a "trouble shooter" working out in the field solving problems for a living.

Later Joe’s co-worker and partner Dan Sutter cannot work the night shift, and Joe has to work with a new repairman called Casey, who has an aptitude for practical jokes. Joe and Casey run into some odd things during their shift, finding a corpse at the place of their first assignment.

When the shift is over, both men go for a drink, and they find their colleague Dan very drunk in a casino. This night the police are on their way to raid the casino, but Casey hears about the raid and manages to warn both his colleagues and the casino owner, causing the raid to be a complete failure.

The next day both Casey and Joe are accused of tipping off the owner and causing the raid to be unsuccessful. In an attempt to exculpate himself, Joe tells his boss about the reason for their involvement in the events, and about Dan’s visit to the casino. The result is that Dan is fired from his position without notice.

Joe has been involved with one of the company’s switchboard operators, Ethel Greenwood. They split up after he suspected her of dating his partner Dan one night when Joe was working overtime. Now he reconciles with her and they go back together. However, soon after they are reunited, Dan tells Ethel about how he got fired from work, and Ethel is upset with Joe for causing it. They break up again.

Joe and Ethel don’t see each other for a while, but he hears she quit her job and started working for another company together with Dan. It turns out the office where they work is a cover-up for a racketeering operation, run by two men by the name of George and Max. Their illegal business idea consists of tapping into the phone lines of a nearby investment company to get secret stock tips.

Joe is unaware of this sly operation, until one day when he and Casey are sent to investigate the investment company’s phone lines. They have complained about the lines malfunctioning,  and when Joe sees the tap he discloses the racketeering operation. Joe catches Dan red handed, as he is trying to get into the investment company’s vaults and steal the contents.

The police are notified, and the robbery in progress is stopped, but Dan manages to escape from the crime scene. Joe tips off the police about Dan and they go to his apartment. When they arrive, Ethel is there to meet up with Dan for their trip to Mexico with the bounty from the robbery. Ethel finds Dan shot and killed in the apartment and comes running out into the street in a state of complete hysteria. When the police catch her, she has a check from Dan’s bosses in her hand, and it has Dan’s fingerprints all over it. Ethel is arrested for killing Dan and being an accomplice in the racketeering operation.

Joe is doubtful of Ethel’s involvement in the illegal business, and he doesn’t believe she killed Dan. He decides to find Dan’s other girlfriend and partner in crime, Pearl Latour. Joe searches all over Long Beach to find her, and eventually he does. Pearl confesses to Joe that she indeed killed Dan, and that the reason was that he was trying to trick her and take the money that was hers. While Joe and Pearl are still talking, an earthquake shakes the whole area, and the house where they are caves in from the shaking. Pearl doesn’t escape the house in time and is buried under the masses, but is still alive. To get Pearl’s story about how she killed Dan, Joe and Casey manage to use an emergency phone line to contact her under the debris. Pearl’s last confession is then heard by the police, and Ethel is released.

Before Joe can take Pearl in, however, a huge earthquake hits Long Beach, and Pearl is buried in debris. Joe and Casey rig an emergency phone line, and police Captain Flynn records Pearl's dying confession. Ethel is cleared of all suspicions and released from jail. Upon her release Ethel and Joe are both guests at Casey and his fiancee Maizie’s wedding at city hall, at which Ethel persuades Joe to get a marriage license of his own.

Cast
 Spencer Tracy as  Joe Graham
 Jack Oakie as  Casey
 Constance Cummings as  Ethel Greenwood
 Morgan Conway as  Dan Sutter
 Arline Judge as  Maizie Bryan
 Paul Harvey as  James Regan
 Judith Wood as  Pearl La Tour
 Joe Sawyer as  Henchman Max Stanley
 Robert Elliott as  Police Captain Flynn
 Franklyn Ardell as  George Martin, Troubleshooter
 Paul Porcasi as  Cabaret Manager
 Charles Lane as  Switchboard Operator

References

External links

1934 films
1930s English-language films
Films directed by William A. Wellman
Films scored by Alfred Newman
1934 crime films
Twentieth Century Pictures films
Films produced by Darryl F. Zanuck
American black-and-white films
United Artists films
American crime films
1930s American films